Breaker Mortar is the seventh studio album by Azalia Snail, released in 1997 by Dark Beloved Cloud.

Track listing

Personnel 
Adapted from Breaker Mortar liner notes.
 Azalia Snail – vocals, instruments, production

Release history

References

External links 
 Breaker Mortar at Discogs (list of releases)
 Breaker Mortar at Bandcamp

1997 albums
Azalia Snail albums